Chicken under a brick, also known as brick chicken, is a roast chicken dish. In most preparations, a whole chicken is seasoned with lemon and herbs and roasted in an oven or grill with a brick placed on top to flatten the chicken and enhance browning. The technique originated in Tuscany as pollo al mattone and has since become popular in many other countries.

See also
 Spatchcocking

References 

Chicken dishes
Italian chicken dishes